Chronicles of America is a fifty volume series on American history published by Yale University Press. A series of film adaptations was also commissioned from the series and about 15 completed. Entries in the series were first published in 1918. They were written by historians about various aspects of American history. The series was edited by Allen Johnson and published by Yale University. All 50 volumes are available on archive.org; some are available on Project Gutenberg.

The Spirit of American Education by Edwin Emery Slosson, was first written and published in 1921.

The 50 volumes in the series are as follows:
 The Red Man's Continent: A Chronicle of Aboriginal America - Ellsworth Huntington
 The Spanish Conquerors: A Chronicle of the Dawn of Empire Overseas - Irving Berdine Richman
 Elizabethan Sea-Dogs: A Chronicle of Drake & His Companions - William Charles Henry Wood
 Crusaders of New France: A Chronicle of the Fleur-de-Lis in the Wilderness - William Bennett Munro
 Pioneers of the Old South: A Chronicle of English Colonial Beginnings - Mary Johnston
 The Fathers of New England: A Chronicle of the Puritan Commonwealth - Charles McLean Andrews
 Dutch & English on the Hudson: A Chronicle of Colonial New York - Maud Wilder Goodwin
 The Quaker Colonies: A Chronicle of the Proprietors of the Delaware - Sydney George Fisher
 Colonial Folkways: A Chronicle of American Life in the Reign of the Georges - Charles M. Andrews
 The Conquest of New France: A Chronicle of the Colonial Wars - George McKinnon Wrong
 The Eve of the Revolution: A Chronicle of the Breach with England - Carl Lotus Becker
 Washington & His Comrades in Arms: A Chronicle of the War of Independence - George McKinnon Wrong
 The Fathers of the Constitution: A Chronicle of the Establishment of the Union - Max Farrand
 Washington  & His Colleagues: A Chronicle of the New Order in Politics - Henry Jones Ford
 J efferson & His Colleagues: A Chronicle of the Virginia Dynasty - Allen Johnson
 John Marshall & the Constitution: A Chronicle of the Supreme Court - Edward Samuel Corwin
 The Fight for a Free Sea: A Chronicle of the War of 1812 - Ralph Delahaye Paine
 Pioneers of the Old Southwest: A Chronicle of the Dark & Bloody Ground - Constance Lindsay Skinner
 The Old Northwest: A Chronicle of the Ohio Valley & Beyond - Frederic Austin Ogg
 The Reign of Andrew Jackson: A Chronicle of the Frontier in Politics - Frederic Austin Ogg
 The Paths of Inland Commerce: A Chronicle of Trail - Archer Butler Hulbert
 Adventures of Oregon: A Chronicle of the Fur Trade - Constance Lindsey Skinner
 The Spanish Borderland: A Chronicle of Old Florida & the Southwest - Herbert Eugene Bolton
 Texas & the Mexican War: A Chronicle of the Winning of the Southwest - Nathaniel W. Stephenson
 The Forty-Niners: A Chronicle of the California Trail & El Dorado - Stewart Edward White
 The Passing of the Frontier: A Chronicle of the Old West - Emerson Hough
 The Cotton Kingdom: A Chronicle of the Old South - William Edward Dodd
 The Anti-Slavery Crusade: A Chronicle of the Gathering Storm - Jesse Macy
 Abraham Lincoln & the Union: A Chronicle of the Embattled North - Nathaniel W. Stephenson
 The Day of the Confederacy: A Chronicle of the Embattled South - Nathaniel W. Stephenson
 Captains of the Civil War: A Chronicle of the Blue & the Gray - William Charles Henry Wood
 The Sequel of Appomattox: A Chronicle of the Reunion of the States - Walter Lynwood Fleming
 The American Spirit in Education: A Chronicle of Great Teachers - Edward Emery Slosson
 The American Spirit in Literature: A Chronicle of Great Interpreters - Bliss Perry
 Our Foreigners: A Chronicle of Americans in the Making - Samuel Peter Orth
 The Old Merchant Marine: A Chronicle of American Ships & Sailors - Ralph Delahaye Painee
 The Age of Invention: A Chronicle of Mechanical Conquest - Holland Thompson
 The Railroad Builders: A Chronicle of the Welding of the States - John Moody
 The Age of Big Business: A Chronicle of the Captains of Industry - Burton J. Hendrick
 The Armies of Labor: A Chronicle of the Organized Wage-Earners - Samuel Peter Orth
 The Masters of Capital: A Chronicle of Wall Street - John Moody
 The New South: A Chronicle of Social & Industrial Evolution - Holland Thompson
 The Boss & the Machine: A Chronicle of the Politicians & Party Organization - Samuel Peter Orth
 The Cleveland Era: A Chronicle of the New Order in Politics - Allen Johnson
 The Agrarian Crusade: A Chronicle of the Farmer in Politics - Solon Justus Buck
 The Path of Empire: A Chronicle of the U.S. as a World Power - Carl Russell Fish
 Theodore Roosevelt & His Times: A Chronicle of the Progressive Movement - Harold Howland
 Woodrow Wilson & the World War: A Chronicle of Our Own Times - Charles Seymour
 The Canadian Dominion: A Chronicle of Our Northern Neighbor - Oscar D. Skelton
 The Hispanic Nations of the New World: A Chronicle of Our Southern Neighbors - William R. Shepherd

Films
In 1923, Yale decided to create a series of films based on the books. Fifteen films were ultimately produced.

The Pilgrims (1924) directed by Edwin Stanton
The Puritans (1924)

References

External links

Chronicles of America movies at the Internet Movie Database

1921 non-fiction books
American history books